O2 Arena may refer to:

The O2 Arena (London)
O2 Arena (Prague)
The 3Arena, Dublin, formerly known as The O2
The Mercedes-Benz Arena, Berlin, formerly known as O2 World Berlin
The Barclays Arena, Hamburg, formerly known as O2 World Hamburg